Loup Township is one of twenty-six townships in Buffalo County, Nebraska, United States. The population was 521 at the 2000 census. A 2006 estimate placed the township's population at 501. By 2017, population estimates put the total at 130.

The Village of Pleasanton lies within the Township.

See also
County government in Nebraska

References

External links
City-Data.com

Townships in Buffalo County, Nebraska
Kearney Micropolitan Statistical Area
Townships in Nebraska